In journalism, a source is a person, publication, or knowledge  other record or document that gives timely information. Outside journalism, sources are sometimes known as "news sources". Examples of sources include but are not limited to official records, publications or broadcasts, officials in government or business, organizations or corporations, witnesses of crime, accidents or other events, and people involved with or affected by a news event or issue.

According to Shoemaker (1996) and McQuail (1994), there are a multitude of factors that tend to condition the acceptance of sources as bona fide by investigative journalists. Reporters are expected to develop and cultivate sources, especially if they regularly cover a specific topic, known as a "beat". Beat reporters must, however, be cautious of becoming too close to their sources. Reporters often, but not always, give greater leeway to sources with little experience. For example, sometimes a person will say they don't want to talk, and then proceed to talk; if that person is not a public figure, reporters are less likely to use that information. Journalists are also encouraged to be skeptical without being cynical, as per the saying "If your mother says she loves you, check it out," popularized by the City News Bureau of Chicago. As a rule of thumb, but especially when reporting on controversy, reporters are expected to use multiple sources.

Ethical guidelines

Confidential information
Off-the-record material is often valuable and reporters may be eager to use it, so sources wishing to ensure the confidentiality of certain information are generally advised to discuss the "terms of use" before disclosing the information, if possible. Some journalists and news organizations have policies against accepting information "off the record" because they believe it interferes with their ability to report truthfully, or because they suspect it may be intended to mislead them or the public.

Even if writers cannot report certain information directly, they can use "off the record" information to uncover related facts, or to find other sources who are willing to speak on the record. This is especially useful in investigative journalism. Information about a surprise event or breaking news, whether on or off the record, is known as a "tip-off". Information that leads to the uncovering of more interesting information is called a "lead".

Anonymous source 
The identity of anonymous sources is sometimes revealed to senior editors or a news organization's lawyers, who would be considered bound by the same confidentiality as the journalist. (Lawyers are generally protected from subpoena in these cases by attorney–client privilege.) Legal staff may need to give counsel about whether it is advisable to publish certain information, or about court proceedings that may attempt to learn confidential information. Senior editors are in the loop to prevent reporters from fabricating non-existent anonymous sources and to provide a second opinion about how to use the information obtained, how to or how not to identify sources, and whether other options should be pursued.

The use of anonymous sources has always been controversial. Some news outlets insist that anonymous sources are the only way to obtain certain information, while others prohibit the use of unnamed sources at all times. News organizations may impose safeguards, such as requiring that information from an anonymous source be corroborated by a second source before it can be printed.

But prominent reports based on anonymous sources have sometimes been proved to be incorrect. For instance, much of the O. J. Simpson reporting from unnamed sources was later deemed inaccurate. Newsweek retracted a story about a Qur'an's allegedly being flushed down a toilet—the story had been based upon one unnamed military source. The Los Angeles Times retracted an article that implicated Sean "Diddy" Combs in the beating of Tupac Shakur. The original article was based on documents and several unnamed sources. When reporting on the original story, the Associated Press noted that "[n]one of the sources was named".

After the embarrassment, a news organization will often "clamp down" on the guidelines for using unnamed sources, but those guidelines are often forgotten after the scandal dies down. One study found that large newspapers' use of anonymous sources dropped dramatically between 2003 and 2004. The Project for Excellence in Journalism, a research group, found use of anonymous sources dropped from 29 percent of all articles in 2003 to just seven percent in 2004, following widespread embarrassment of media after the Bush administration claims that Iraq had WMD were found to be without basis.

Sex with sources
In the U.S., this practice is generally not well seen. However, lengthy lists of reporters' sexual involvement with sources were published by American Journalism Review and by The Los Angeles Times.

Not on tape

Whether in a formal, sit-down interview setting or an impromptu meeting on the street, some sources request that all or part of the encounter not be captured in an audio or video recording ("tape"), but continue speaking to the reporter. As long as the interview is not confidential, the reporter may report the information given by the source, even repeating direct quotes (perhaps scribbled on a notepad or recalled from memory). This often shows up in broadcasts as "John Brown declined to be interviewed on camera, but said" or simply "a spokesperson said".

Some interview subjects are uncomfortable being recorded. Some are afraid they will be inarticulate or feel like a fool if the interview is broadcast. Others might be uncooperative or distrust the motives or competence of the journalist, and wish to prevent them from being able to broadcast an unflattering sound bite or part of the interview out of context. Professional public relations officers know that having the reporter repeat their words, rather than being heard directly on the air, will blunt the effect of their words. By refusing to be taped or on the air, a person avoids having an audience see or hear them being uncomfortable (if they have unpleasant news); it also permits the individual to be anonymous or identified only by title.

Attribution

In journalism, attribution is the identification of the source of reported information. Journalists' ethical codes normally address the issue of attribution, which is sensitive because in the course of their work, journalists may receive information from sources who wish to remain anonymous. In investigative journalism, important news stories often depend on such information. For example, the Watergate scandal which led to the downfall of U.S. president Richard Nixon was in part exposed by information revealed by an anonymous source ("Deep Throat") to investigative reporters Bob Woodward and Carl Bernstein.

Ethics

Divulging the identity of a confidential source is frowned upon by groups representing journalists in many democracies. In many countries, journalists have no special legal status, and may be required to divulge their sources in the course of a criminal investigation, as any other citizen would be. Even in jurisdictions that grant journalists special legal protections, journalists are typically required to testify if they bear witness to a crime.

Journalists defend the use of anonymous sources for a variety of reasons:
 Access. Some sources refuse to share stories without the shield of anonymity, including many government officials.
 Protection from reprisal or punishment. Other sources are concerned about reprisal or punishment as a result of sharing information with journalists.
 Illegal activity. Sources which are engaged in illegal activity are usually reluctant to be named in order to avoid self-incrimination. This includes sources which are leaking classified information or details of court proceedings which are sealed from the public.

The use of anonymous sources is also criticized by some journalists and government officials:
 Unreliability. It is difficult for a reader to evaluate the reliability and neutrality of a source they cannot identify, and the reliability of the news as a whole is reduced when it relies upon information from anonymous sources.
 Misinformation and propaganda. Anonymous sources may be reluctant to be identified because the information they are sharing is uncertain or known to them to be untrue, but they want attention or to spread propaganda via the press, such as in the case of the Iraqi aluminum tubes, where tubes known to be useless for uranium refinement were presented as evidence of Saddam Hussein's nuclear weapons program by anonymous sources in the U.S. intelligence community in order to build public support for an attack on Iraq. It may also be used to attack political enemies and present opinions as facts. Several journalists, including Paul Carr, have argued that if an off-the-record briefing is a deliberate lie journalists should feel permitted to name the source. The Washington Post identified a source who had offered a story in an attempt to discredit media and to distract from the issue at hand with respect to a case of sexual impropriety.
 Illegal activity. The use of anonymous sources encourages some sources to divulge information which it is illegal for them to divulge, such as the details of a legal settlement, grand jury testimony, or classified information. This information is illegal to disclose for reasons such as national security, protecting witnesses, preventing slander and libel, and ending lawsuits without lengthy, expensive trials and encouraging people to disclose such information defeats the purpose of the disclosure being illegal. In some cases, a reporter may encourage a source to disclose classified information, resulting in accusations of espionage.
 Fabricated sources. A journalist may fabricate a news story and ascribe the information to anonymous sources to fabricate news, create false detail for a news story, commit plagiarism, or protect themselves from accusations of libel.

Speaking terms

There are several categories of "speaking terms" (agreements concerning attribution) that cover information conveyed in conversations with journalists. In the UK the following conventions are generally accepted:

 "On the record": all that is said can be quoted and attributed.
 "Unattributable": what is said can be reported but not attributed.
 "Off the record": the information is provided to inform a decision or provide a confidential explanation, not for publication.

However, confusion over the precise meaning of "unattributable" and "off-the-record" has led to more detailed formulations:

See also

 Angle
 Shield laws in the United States

Notes

References

 McQuail, D. (1994) Mass Communication Theory. London: Sage.
 Shoemaker, P. and Reese, S.D. (1996) Mediating the Message. London: Longman.

External links
 Be Clear About Your Source's Biases and Agendas. Project for Excellence in Journalism. Archived from the original on 18 November 2005.
 Chart – Real and Fake News (2016)/Vanessa Otero (basis) (Mark Frauenfelder)
 Chart – Real and Fake News (2014) (2016)/Pew Research Center
 Information for Journalists from the United States Department of State (scroll to "Ground Rules for Interviewing State Department Officials" section)
 Protection of journalistic sources, a factsheet of the ECtHR case law
 Viewers as Sources , from Newslab

 
Journalism standards